Ulick Lupede (born 1 June 1984 in Pointe-à-Pitre) is a French footballer currently under amator contract for French side C.O. Saint-Saturnin Arche.

Lupede previously played for Le Mans Union Club 72 in Ligue 1 and Ligue 2.

Lupede appeared in four 2010 Caribbean Cup matches to help Guadeloupe to a runner's-up finish.

References

1984 births
Living people
French footballers
Guadeloupean footballers
Association football defenders
Le Mans FC players
Entente SSG players
2011 CONCACAF Gold Cup players
Guadeloupe international footballers
Tours FC players
Rodez AF players
Associação Naval 1º de Maio players
S.C. Covilhã players